The 2023 Big Ten men's basketball tournament was a postseason men's basketball tournament for the Big Ten Conference of the 2022–23 NCAA Division I men's basketball season which took place from March 8–12, 2023. The tournament was held at the United Center in Chicago, Illinois. 

Purdue defeated Penn State 67–65 to win the tournament. As a result, they received the conference's automatic bid to the 2023 NCAA tournament.

Seeds
All 14 Big Ten schools participated in the tournament. Teams were seeded by conference record, with a tiebreaker system used to seed teams with identical conference records. The top 10 teams received a first round bye and the top four teams received a double bye. Tiebreaking procedures remained unchanged from the 2022 tournament.

Schedule

*Game times in Central Time. #Rankings denote tournament seeding.

Bracket

* denotes overtime period

Game summaries

First round

Second round

Quarterfinals

Semifinals

Championship

References

Tournament
Big Ten men's basketball tournament
Basketball competitions in Chicago
College basketball tournaments in Illinois
Big Ten men's basketball tournament
Big Ten men's basketball tournament
2020s in Chicago